Lateness of Dancers is the fifth studio album by American band Hiss Golden Messenger. It was released on September 9, 2014, under Merge Records.

Critical reception
Lateness of Dancers was met with universal acclaim reviews from critics. At Metacritic, which assigns a weighted average rating out of 100 to reviews from mainstream publications, this release received an average score of 81, based on 16 reviews.

Accolades

Track listing

Personnel 

 MC Taylor - lead vocals, guitars, production
 Scott Hirsch - bass guitar, pedal steel, mandolin, mixing, production
 Phil Cook - guitars, banjo, piano, organ, electric piano, background vocals
 Brad Cook - bass guitar, background vocals
 Matt McCaughan - drums, percussion
 Chris Boerner - guitars
 Terry Lonergan - drums, percussion
 William Tyler - guitars
 Alexandra Sauser-Monnig - background vocals
 Bobby Britt - fiddle
 Mark Paulson - strings

Charts

References

2014 albums
Hiss Golden Messenger albums
Merge Records albums